The Sussex Record Society is a text publication society founded in 1901. It publishes scholarly editions of historical records relating to the English county of Sussex. It is a registered charity.

Selected publications
 Church Surveys of Chichester Archdeaconry 1602, 1610 & 1636, Vol. 98. 2016. 
 Chichester Archdeaconry Depositions 1603-1608, Vol. 97. 2015. 
 Letters of John Collier of Hastings 1731-1746, Vol. 96. 2014. 
 Littlehampton School Logbook 1871-1911, Vol. 95. 2013. 
 Winchelsea Poor Law Records 1790-1841. Malcolm Pratt, Vol. 94. 2012. 
 East Sussex Church Monuments 1530-1830. Nigel Llewellyn, Vol. 93. s. 2010/11
 Accounts and Records of the Manor of Mote in Iden 1441-1551, 1673. Mark Gardiner and Christopher Whittick, Vol. 92. 2009. 
 Sussex Clergy Inventories 1660-1750. Annabelle Hughes, Vol. 91. 2008. 
 The Durford Cartulary. Janet Stevenson, Vol. 90. 2007. 
 East Sussex Coroners’ Records 1688-1838. Roy Hunnisett, Vol. 89. 2006.
 Sussex Cricket in the Eighteenth Century. Timothy J. McCann, Vol. 88. 2005.
 East Sussex Parliamentary Deposited Plans 1799-1970. Roger Davey, Vol. 87. 2003.
 Sussex Shore to Flanders Fields: Heron-Allens Journal of the Great War. Brian W. Harvey and Carol Fitzgerald, Vol. 86. 2002.
 Sussex Depicted – Views and descriptions 1600-1800. John H. Farrant, Vol. 85. 2001.
 Sussex in the First World War. Keith Grieves, Vol. 84. 2004.
 Mid Sussex Poor Law Records, 1601-1835. Ian Nelson & Norma Pilbeam, Vol. 83. 2002. 
 West Sussex Land Tax, 1785. Alan Readman, Lionel Falconer, Rosie Ritchie & Peter Wilkinson, Vol. 82. 2001.
 Sussex Schools in the 18th Century. John Caffyn, Vol. 81 1998.
 The Ashdown Forest Dispute 1876-1882. Brian Short 1997, Vol. 80 1997. 
 Saint Richard of Chichester. David Jones, Vol. 79 1995.
 Chichester Diocesan Surveys, 1686 and 1724 Wyn K. Ford, Vol. 78 1994. 
 East Sussex Land Tax, 1785. Roger Davey, Vol. 77 1991. 
 The Fuller Letters, 1728-1755. David Crossley & Richard Saville, Vol. 76 1991. 
 The Religious Census of Sussex. John A, Vickers, Vol. 75 1989.
 Sussex Coroners Inquests, 1485-1558. R. F. Hunnisett, Vol. 74 1985. 
 Correspondence of the Dukes of Richmond and Newcastle, 1724-1750. Timothy J. McCann, Vol. 73 1984. 
 Printed Maps of Sussex 1575-1900. David Kingsley, Vol. 72 1982. 
 Accounts of the Roberts Family of Boarzell, 1568-1582. Robert Tittler, Vol. 71 1979. 
 The Town Book of Lewes, 1837-1901, Verena Smith, Vol. 70 1976. 
 The Town Book of Lewes, 1702-1837, Verena Smith, Vol. 69 1973 
 The Journal of Giles Moore of Horsted Keynes, 1655-1679. Ruth Bird, Vol. 68 1971 
 Estate Surveys of the Fitzalan Earls of Arundel, 14th century. Marie Clough, Vol. 67 1969. 
 A Catalogue of Sussex Estate and Tithe Award Maps, Part II, 1597-1958. Francis W. Steer, Vol. 66 1968. 
 Cellarers Rolls of Battle Abbey. Eleanor Searle & Barbara Ross, Vol. 65 1967. 
 Rye Shipping Records, 1556-1590. Richard F. Dell, Vol. 64 1966 
 The Book of Bartholomew Bolney, 15th century. Marie Clough, Vol. 63 1964 
 Minutes of the Common Council of the City of Chichester, 1783-1826. Francis W. Steer, Vol. 62 1963. 
 A Catalogue of Sussex Estate and Tithe Award Maps, Part I, 1606-1884. Francis W. Steer, Vol. 61 1962. 
 Custumals of the Manors of Laughton, Willingdon and Goring, 1292-1338. A. E. Wilson, Vol. 60 1962. 
 Chartulary of Boxgrove Priory, 12th-14th centuries. Lindsay Fleming, Vol. 59. s 1960. 
 Chapter Acts, Chichester, 1545-1642. W. D. Peckham, Vol. 58 1960. 
 Custumals of Sussex Manors of the Archbishop of Canterbury, 1285-1330. B.C Redwood & A. E. Wilson, Vol. 57 1958. 
 Lay Subsidy Rolls, 1524-1525. Julian Cornwall, Vol. 56 1957 
 Ministers Accounts of the Manor of Petworth, 1347-1353. L. F. Salzman, Vol. 55 1955. 
 Quarter Sessions Order Book, 1642-1649. B.C Redwood, Vol. 54 1954. 
 The Manor of Etchingham cum Salehurst. Sir Sylvanus P, Vivian, Vol. 53 1953. 
 Chapter Acts, Chichester, 1472-1544. W. D. Peckham, Vol. 52 1952. 
 Sussex Views from the Burrell Collection 1776-1791. Walter H Godfrey and L.F. Salzman. Jubilee Vol. 1951. 
 Record of Deputations of Gamekeepers. L. F. Salzman, Vol. 51 1951. 
 Churchwardens Presentments, Part I, Archdeaconry of Lewes. Hilda Johnstone, Vol. 50 1950.

References 

1901 establishments in England
History of Sussex
Historical societies of the United Kingdom
Text publication societies